John Noble (born 25 March 1997) is an Australian rules footballer playing for  in the Australian Football League (AFL). Playing as a half-back or winger, he was selected in the 2019 mid-season draft after spending several years in the South Australian National Football League (SANFL). He made his AFL debut late in the 2019 season.

SANFL career 
Noble, originally from Adelaide, was born prematurely and had an identical twin, requiring him to take medication during childhood which delayed his development. He began playing for West Adelaide in the SANFL from 2016, playing 43 games and kicking 24 goals during his time at the club. Noble represented his league in a 2019 match against a West Australian Football League (WAFL) representative side, laying four tackles and amassing 24 disposals.

AFL career 
Noble was recruited by Collingwood with pick 14 in the 2019 mid-season draft, replacing Lynden Dunn after he was moved to the long-term injury list. The club's recruiting manager, Derek Hine, cited Noble's combination of speed and endurance, together with his performance in the state-league representative match, as the reasons he was selected. Ben Hopkins, West Adelaide's chief executive, congratulated Noble on his selection but pointed out the club's disadvantage and lack of compensation for losing him to the AFL.

Noble initially wore guernsey 49 while at Collingwood. He began playing in the club's reserves side in the Victorian Football League (VFL), but after a mere three matches he was called up to the AFL team in a round 17 match against . Noble accumulated 17 possessions on debut but injured his calf. He returned in the last two rounds of the home-and-away season and went on to play in Collingwood's two finals. Ahead of the 2020 season he re-signed with Collingwood until the end of 2021, and inherited guernsey 9 from Sam Murray, who had been delisted.

Family 
Noble is the son of David Noble, who was sports administrator with experience at Adelaide and the Brisbane Lions. Noble was able to use his father's connections, knowledge and advice to assist him as a prospective draftee. In November 2020, David was appointed as the senior coach of North Melbourne.

Statistics 
Updated to the end of the 2022 season.

|-
| 2019 ||  || 49
| 5 || 0 || 1 || 55 || 38 || 93 || 20 || 11 || 0.0 || 0.2 || 11.0 || 7.6 || 18.6 || 4.0 || 2.2 || 0
|- 
| 2020 ||  || 9
| 17 || 2 || 0 || 161 || 116 || 277 || 56 || 29 || 0.1 || 0.0 || 9.5 || 6.8 || 16.3 || 3.3 || 1.7 || 1
|-
| 2021 ||  || 9
| 22 || 2 || 0 || 260 || 149 || 409 || 114 || 57 || 0.1 || 0.0 || 11.8 || 6.8 || 18.6 || 5.2 || 2.6 || 0
|-
| 2022 ||  || 9
| 25 || 0 || 0 || 291 || 149 || 440 || 116 || 66 || 0.0 || 0.0 || 11.6 || 6.0 || 17.6 || 4.6 || 2.6 || 0
|- class=sortbottom
! colspan=3 | Career
! 69 !! 4 !! 1 !! 767 !! 452 !! 1219 !! 306 !! 163 !! 0.1 !! 0.0 !! 11.1 !! 6.6 !! 17.6 !! 4.6 !! 2.6 !! 1
|}

Notes

References

External links 

Living people
1997 births
Australian rules footballers from Adelaide
West Adelaide Football Club players
Collingwood Football Club players
People educated at Sacred Heart College, Adelaide
Twin sportspeople